Tom Coolen (born November 20, 1953 in Halifax, Nova Scotia) is a Canadian professional ice hockey coach. He is currently the head coach of GKS Katowice in the Polska Hokej Liga, and an assistant coach for the Polish men's national team. He is a two time winner of the CIS Coach of the Year award, and a three time AUS Coach of the Year recipient. He built two National Championship teams at Acadia University and 5 AUS champions at Acadia and the University of New Brunswick. At the 2014 Sochi Winter Olympics, Coolen served as assistant coach to Ted Nolan.

He began his coaching career at the Canadian university level, first as an assistant coach for the UNB Varsity Reds and later as head coach for the Acadia Axemen. He then continued his career coaching in various European leagues, including the German DEL and DEL2, Italian Serie A, Swiss NLA, Austrian EBEL, Danish Metal Ligaen, and Finnish Liiga.

From 2012-2015, he served as an assistant coach for the Latvian national team. From 2014-2015, he was also an assistant coach for the Buffalo Sabres under head coach Ted Nolan.

References

1953 births
Living people
Buffalo Sabres coaches
Canadian ice hockey coaches
Ice hockey people from Nova Scotia
Sportspeople from Halifax, Nova Scotia